Turridrupa gatchensis is a species of sea snail, a marine gastropod mollusk in the family Turridae, the turrids.

Description
The length of the shell varies between 13 mm and 15 mm.

Distribution
This marine species occurs off New Caledonia and the Loyalty Islands

References

 Fischer-Piette, E., 1950. Liste des types décrits dans le Journal de Conchyliologie et conservés dans la collection de ce journal (avec planches)(suite). Journal de Conchyliologie 90: 149-180

External links
 Hervier J. (1896). Descriptions d'espèces nouvelles de l'archipel Néo-Calédonien. Journal de Conchyliologie. 43(3): 141–152

gatchensis
Gastropods described in 1896